Megaport may refer to:

 Megaport (company), listed on the S&P/ASX 200
 Megaport Music Festival in Taiwan
 North Carolina International Port, project
 San Lorenzo Megaport Project, a proposed port plan